The 1999 South Oxfordshire District Council election took place on 6 May 1999 to elect members of South Oxfordshire District Council, a non-metropolitan district council in Oxfordshire, England. This was part of the wider 1999 UK local elections. The whole council was up for election and the council stayed under no overall control.

Election result

References

1999
1999 English local elections
20th century in Oxfordshire